Liang Jui-wei (born 22 September 1990) is a Taiwanese badminton player from Land Bank team. He educated at the Jinwen University of Science and Technology majoring in Hotel Management Department. In 2014, he competed at the Incheon Asian Games.

Achievements

BWF Grand Prix (1 title, 1 runner-up) 
The BWF Grand Prix has two level such as Grand Prix and Grand Prix Gold. It is a series of badminton tournaments, sanctioned by Badminton World Federation (BWF) since 2007.

Men's Doubles

 BWF Grand Prix Gold tournament
 BWF Grand Prix tournament

BWF International Challenge/Series (3 titles, 2 runners-up)
Men's Doubles

 BWF International Challenge tournament
 BWF International Series tournament

References

External links
 

Taiwanese male badminton players
Living people
1990 births
Place of birth missing (living people)
Asian Games medalists in badminton
Asian Games bronze medalists for Chinese Taipei
Badminton players at the 2014 Asian Games
Medalists at the 2014 Asian Games
21st-century Taiwanese people